A Marfona is a potato cultivar with a moderately waxy texture. It originated in the Netherlands in 1975. 
It has a light brown or yellow skin and a yellow to cream flesh, and is a high yielding Second Early variety.

Due to the potato having a strong flavour it is very good for use as baking, boiling and mashing.

References

Potato cultivars